Bie-modern is a theory of social form and historical development elaborated by the Chinese philosopher and aesthetician Wang Jianjiang. Specifically, bie-modern theory is based on the difference between the western dynamical development model, which distinguishes three cut-period phases (namely pre-modern, modern and post-modern), and the coexistence model of pre-modern and post-modern in current China. The aim of bie-modern theory is to identify and further explore the specificity of China’s cultural, artistic and aesthetic status, especially compared to the western scenario.
Bie-modern theory has produced an international discussion among scholars. Two research centres have been recently established, respectively the Chinese Bie-Modern Studies (CCBMS) at the Georgia Southwestern State University (2017) and the Bie-modern Research Centre at the University of Primorska (2019)

References

Further reading 

Erjavec, Aleš. "Zhuyi: From Absence to Bustle?", in Bie-Modern: Discourse Innovation & International Academic Dialogue. China Social Science Press: 2018, pp. 42–71.  
Wang, Jianjiang, and Wynn, Keaton. Bie-Modern: Works and Commentary. China Social Science Press: 2018. 
Wang, Jianjiang, and Erjavec, Aleš. Bie-Modern: Discourse Innovation & International Academic Dialogue. China Social Science Press: 2018. 
Wang, Jianjiang, "Chinese aesthetics: the absence and reconstruction of Zhuyi", in Exploration and Free Views, No. 7, 2012, pp. 25–30.
Ženko, Ernest, "Lessons in Equality: Some Remarks on the Development of Chinese Aesthetics", in Bie-Modern: Discourse Innovation & International Academic Dialogue. China Social Science Press: 2018, pp. 131–156. 

Philosophical theories